Barry Everitt may refer to:

Barry Everitt (rugby union) (born 1976), former rugby union footballer
Barry Everitt (scientist) (born 1946), British neuroscientist